The 2022 British Swimming Championships were held at the Ponds Forge International Sports Centre in Sheffield, from 5 April to the 10 April 2022. They also doubled as the trials for the 2022 Commonwealth Games and the World Championships. They were organised by British Swimming.

Medal winners

Men's events

Women's events

See also
List of British Swimming Championships champions

References

2022
2022 in swimming
2022 in British sport
British Swimming Championships